On 5 September 2016, suicide bombers simultaneously exploded in the Syrian cities of Tartus, Homs, Damascus, and Hasakah. A car bomb detonated on a coastal highway in Tartus, killing more than five people, followed by a suicide bomber exploding in the crowd gathering in the area. A car bomb then hit a Syrian Army checkpoint in the Zahra district of Homs and killed two soldiers. A motorcycle bomb detonated near an Asayish checkpoint in Hasakah and killed at least five people, with an explosion in the capital city of Damascus following soon after.

References

ISIL terrorist incidents in Syria
Mass murder in 2016
Mass murder in Syria
September 2016 crimes in Asia
Suicide bombings in Syria
Terrorist incidents in Syria in 2016
2016 murders in Syria